Cryptocarya bidwillii, the yellow laurel, is a small to medium-sized tree in the laurel family. Occurring in Australian rainforests from Nymboida in the state of New South Wales to Townsville in tropical Queensland. Often found in the dryer ridges in dry rainforest or in viney scrubs.

Naming 
The type specimen was collected by John Carne Bidwill at Wide Bay, Queensland. Cryptocarya is literally "concealed nut". Alluding to the fleshy perianth concealing the hard seed within. The Swiss botanist Carl Meissner is the describing scientist.

Description 

The yellow laurel reaches a height of 20 metres and a trunk diameter of 50 cm. Usually seen much smaller, with a low spreading crown on a short bole. Often seen with coppice shoots from the base.

Trunk, bark and leaves 

The trunk is straight and round in cross section, though somewhat flanged or buttressed in larger specimens. The bark is grey or brown and usually fairly smooth. Some reddish lenticels or horizontal cracks may be seen. Small branches are smooth with green tips, with raised dots.

Leaves are alternate, elliptic, 6 to 12 cm long, with a blunt tip. Both leaf sides green and glossy. Leaf margins wavy, leaf stalks 5 to 10 mm long. Leaf veins visible on both surfaces, more evident above the leaf. Three to ten lateral veins, angled at 45 degrees to the mid-vein. Net veins easily seen. Underneath the leaf, the mid-vein is raised and slightly flattened.

Flowers, fruit and germination 

White or cream flowers in panicles. Individual flowers about 3 mm long, bell shaped and hairy. Flowering occurs between November to January.

The fruit is a black globular drupe, usually ribbed and pointed. 12 mm in diameter. The seed is around 8 mm in diameter. Fruit ripe from November to February. Eaten by the rose-crowned fruit-dove, topknot pigeon and wompoo fruit dove. Like most Australian Cryptocarya fruit, removal of the fleshy aril is advised to assist seed germination. Seeds germinate well.

References
Notes

Bibliography
 

 https://archive.today/20121215182221/http://www.brisrain.webcentral.com.au/01_cms/details_pop.asp?ID=98

Laurales of Australia
Trees of Australia
Flora of New South Wales
Flora of Queensland
bidwillii